The 27th International Film Festival of India was held from 10 to 20 January 1996 in New Delhi.
The competitive edition was restricted to "Asian Women Directors".

Madan Lal Khurana was appointed director of the festival, and was inaugurated by filmmaker B. R. Chopra.

Winners
Golden Peacock (Best Film):  "Blush" by "Li Shaohong"

References

1996 film festivals
International Film Festival of India
1996 in Indian cinema